The Liberal Party (Jiyūtō) was a political party in Japan.

History
The party was established in March 1950 as a merger of the Democratic Liberal Party led by Prime Minister Shigeru Yoshida (which held a majority in the House of Representatives) and 22 MPs from the Alliance faction of the Democratic Party, although Alliance leader Takeru Inukai did not join the new party. In the April 1950 House of Councillors elections, it won 52 of the 132 seats.

In August 1952, Ichirō Hatoyama was allowed to rejoin the party, having been banned from politics as a result of the purge. A former leader of the original post-war Liberal Party, he expected Yoshida to allow him to take over the party again, but was rebuffed. This led to increasing tensions within the party, splitting it into Hatoyama and Yoshida factions.

Although the party won a majority of seats in the House of Representatives in the October 1952 elections, winning 242 of the 466 seats, Yoshida's government lost a vote of no-confidence in March 1953, leading to early elections. Prior to polling day, the Hatoyama faction broke away to form Liberal Party–Hatoyama, which won 35 seats in the elections as the Liberal Party was reduced to 202 seats. The simultaneous House of Councillor elections also saw the party lose is majority in the upper house. However, Yoshida was able to form a minority government, and later in the year Hatoyama and 25 other Liberal Party–Hatoyama MPs rejoined the Liberal Party.

Another split occurred in November 1954 when 35 MPs left the Liberal Party to merge with the Japan Liberal Party and the Kaishintō to form the Japan Democratic Party (JDP). A no-confidence motion was passed shortly afterwards, resulting in the resignation of Yoshida and Hatoyama, now a member of the JDP, becoming the new Prime Minister.

In the February 1955 general elections, the party was reduced to 114 seats as it was defeated by the JDP. On 15 November that year the two parties merged to form the Liberal Democratic Party.

Leaders

Election results

House of Representatives

House of Councillors

References

Defunct political parties in Japan
Political parties established in 1950
1950 establishments in Japan
Political parties disestablished in 1955
1955 disestablishments in Japan